The Chinese Ambassador to Saudi Arabia is the official representative of the People's Republic of China to Saudi Arabia.

List of representatives

Republic of China

People's Republic of China

See also
China–Saudi Arabia relations
Saudi Arabia–Taiwan relations

References 

Ambassadors of China to Saudi Arabia
Saudi Arabia
China